Manfred G. Schmidt (born 25 July 1948 in Donauwörth, Germany) is professor of political science at the Faculty of Economic and Social Sciences of the University of Heidelberg.

Education 
After studying political science and English studies, Manfred G. Schmidt received his PhD in political science from the University of Tübingen, directed by Gerhard Lehmbruch. He received his postdoctoral degree (Habilitation) from the University of Konstanz in 1981.

Career 
In 1982, he was appointed professor of political science at the Free University of Berlin. In 1987, he became professor of political science at the University of Heidelberg. After conducting research at the Center for Social Policy Studies, University of Bremen, from 1997, he returned to a professorship at the University of Heidelberg in 2001. He was the director of the Institute of Political Science at the University of Heidelberg from that time until 2006. Since 2006/07, Schmidt has been dean of the Faculty of Economic and Social Sciences of the University of Heidelberg.

In 1981, he was awarded the Stein Rokkan Prize. In 1995, he received the Leibniz Prize of the German Research Council (DFG). In 1999, a survey of the German Research Council among political scientists ranked him as the third most important political scientist in Germany, and as the most important researcher in comparative politics in Germany. 
He was elected as a member of the Heidelberg Academy of Sciences in 2002 and as a member of the Berlin-Brandenburg Academy of Sciences and Humanities one year later.

His research focuses on political institutions in Germany, social policies in comparative perspectives and theories of democracy.

Books/edited volumes (selection) 
 Das politische System der Bundesrepublik Deutschland, Munich: C.H. Beck 2005.
 Der Wohlfahrtsstaat. Eine Einführung in den historischen und internationalen Vergleich, Wiesbaden: VS Verlag für Sozialwissenschaften.
 Political Institutions in the Federal Republic of Germany, Oxford: Oxford University Press, 2003.
 Regieren in der Bundesrepublik Deutschland. Innen- und Außenpolitik seit 1949, Wiesbaden: VS Verlag für Sozialwissenschaften 2006 (co-editor Reimut Zohlnhöfer).

Articles 
 
 
 
  Preview.
 
 
 
 
 
  Full text.

References

1948 births
Academic staff of the Free University of Berlin
German political scientists
Gottfried Wilhelm Leibniz Prize winners
Academic staff of Heidelberg University
Academic staff of the University of Bremen
University of Tübingen alumni
Winners of the Stein Rokkan Prize for Comparative Social Science Research
Living people
People from Donauwörth